So Notorious, sometimes stylized So NoTORIous, is an American sitcom starring — and loosely based on the life of — actress Tori Spelling. The series debuted on VH1 on April 2, 2006, and despite lasting only ten episodes, received substantial acclaim from critics.

Premise
The series follows the actress as she tries to downplay the fact that she is the daughter of Aaron Spelling (his name is rarely mentioned in series; he is referred to by Tori as "Daddy" and taking a cue from Charlie's Angels is only heard off-camera). Despite the fact that her father is very wealthy, Tori tries to prove that she just wants people to like her for herself and take her seriously.

Along with Tori the show features her close friends Pete (James Carpinello), a roommate who shares Tori's condo and has a habit of bringing women to the place every night by bragging about Tori being his roommate; Janey (Brennan Hesser), a real estate agent with a habit for being nosy and ambitious; and Sasan (Zachary Quinto), an openly bisexual (except to his parents) Iranian-American who tends to be critical at times, hoping it will knock a little sense into Tori. She is also seen carrying around her overweight pug Mimi LaRue, who is frequently dressed in tacky designer clothes.

In addition, Tori also has to deal with her self-absorbed mother Candy "KiKi" Spelling, whose history of how Tori was raised and why she treats her daughter as if she doesn't exist may explain why Tori acts like she does; Margaret (Cleo King), the nanny who raised Tori and is more motherly to her than KiKi; and Ruthie Rose, her frenetic, doting, and not-so-reliable manager.

Cast
 Tori Spelling (Herself)
 Loni Anderson (KiKi Spelling)
 James Carpinello (Pete)
 Brennan Hesser (Janey)
 Zachary Quinto (Sasan)
 Jeanetta Arnette (Ruthie Rose)
 Cleo King (Nanny)
 Joanna Sanchez (Vilma)
 Natalija Nogulich (Touca)
 Brian George (Omid)
 Ariel Winter (Little Tori)

Episodes

Critical response
The show received quite a substantial number of positive notices from critics. The New York Post raved that the show was a "very witty, sometimes brilliantly insightful hybrid sitcom". Newsday admired that "the writing is pointed, the direction tight. But what really makes it work is Tori herself, light, bright and vulnerably likable."

The Hollywood Reporter called the show "considerably more ambitious than a lot of other sitcoms" and said that "It's easy to dismiss this as another attempt by Spelling to prove that her talent goes beyond her last name, but there's more to it than that. She creates an appealing character despite all the preconceptions, many of which are acknowledged and dispensed with in the first few scenes." The Los Angeles Times conceded that "while this sort of thing has been done before – it has been done here exceedingly well." The Chicago Tribune began their review with "there are people in the world who'll never watch anything that stars Tori Spelling. Their loss." The review went on to praise the show; admitting that "Spelling’s surprisingly good VH1 series, is a not-at-all-guilty pleasure. It has more than its share of amusing moments, and it also has a surprising amount of heart." The Detroit Free Press called the show "a sassy, classy winner".

The show was nominated for Outstanding Comedy Series at the 2007 GLAAD Media Awards.

Additional information
Created by Chris Alberghini, Mike Chessler and Tori Spelling, the series was produced by NBC Universal Television. It was originally intended for the NBC network, but when they passed on the completed pilot episode the producers sought another outlet and eventually landed a deal with VH1. Paramount Home Entertainment issued the November 21, 2006 DVD release So NoTORIous: The Complete Series.

Although the first nine episodes aired on VH1, the "Canadian" episode was broadcast on its sister network LOGO on June 1, 2006. This episode is not available for purchase on iTunes or Amazon Video, but is included as an additional feature on the 2006 DVD release.

References

External links
 

2006 American television series debuts
2006 American television series endings
2000s American sitcoms
English-language television shows
Television series by CBS Studios
VH1 original programming